Liu Jian (born January 1956) is a Chinese diplomat. He was born in Jiangsu. He was Ambassador of the People's Republic of China to Afghanistan (2005-2007), Malaysia (2008-2010) and Pakistan (2010-2013).

References

1956 births
Living people
Ambassadors of China to Afghanistan
Ambassadors of China to Malaysia
Ambassadors of China to Pakistan